The 5 January 2006 Iraq bombings were a series of suicide attacks that occurred on 5 January 2006, in the Shiite holy city of Karbala and in Ramadi city centre, each killing about 60 or more.

The bombings in Ramadi consisted of two suicide bombers detonating their bombs within minutes of each other.  The casualty count by personnel on the ground put the total at 118 (including the two working dogs) 110 of which were Iraqi civilians volunteering to become Iraqi police; 8 were Americans including 2 working dogs. Thirty civilians died immediately and a further 46 were taken to Camp Ramadi for treatment.

Perpetrators 
A day later, residents of Ramadi blamed al Qaeda in Iraq for the attack.

References

External links

Iraq suicide bomb blasts kill 120 BBC News (5 January 2006)
Insurgents Kill 140 as Iraq Clashes Escalate The Washington Post (6 January 2006)
Up to 130 Killed in Iraq, Drawing a Shiite Warning The New York Times  (6 January 2006)
Hope Seen Amid Violence

2006 murders in Iraq
21st-century mass murder in Iraq
January 2006 events in Iraq
Mass murder in 2006
Suicide bombings in Iraq
Terrorist incidents in Iraq in 2006
Violence against Shia Muslims in Iraq